Sudhakarrao Naik was sworn in as Chief Minister of Maharashtra on 25 June 1991, on resignation of his predecessor Sharad Pawar. The ministry served until February 1993, when Naik resigned due to his inability to handle the 1993 Bombay riots, and was replaced by Pawar.

List of ministers
The ministry initially contained Naik and 7 Cabinet ministers. On 28 June 1991, 8 more cabinet ministers and 21 ministers of state were included in the cabinet. The ministry contained:

References

Indian National Congress
1991 in Indian politics
Naik  
Cabinets established in 1991
Cabinets disestablished in 1993